Kharan Fort is a fort located in Kharan, Balochistan, Pakistan. The fort was built in the Iranian style, with thick burnt bricks and dome-shaped features for security purposes.

History
Kharan Fort was built by Azad Khan Nosherwani of Kharan.

References

Forts in Balochistan
Kharan District